Menai may refer to the following places:

Australia
Menai, New South Wales

Africa
Menai Bay on the island of Zanzibar, Tanzania
Menai Island, a Cosmoledo atoll islet, Seychelles

Europe
Menai, an electoral ward in Bangor, Wales, UK
Menai (Caernarfon ward) in Wales, UK
The Menai Strait in North Wales, UK
The Menai Suspension Bridge across the strait
Coleg Menai, Bangor (near the bridge)
Menai Bridge, a town near the bridge
Mineo, Italy